Anchorage Opera (AO) is a professional opera company located in Anchorage, Alaska and is a member of OPERA America.

History
Anchorage Opera was one of the first major performing arts institutions established by Americans in the Circumpolar North.  The company was officially incorporated as Anchorage Civic Opera in 1962. Lorene Harrison once worked with the opera.  Anchorage Opera was the first opera company to perform Behind The Green Door.

References

External links
 Official Site of Anchorage Opera

American opera companies
Musical groups established in 1962
Performing arts in Alaska
1962 establishments in Alaska